Asosa Airport  is an airport serving Asosa, the capital of the western Benishangul-Gumuz Region in Ethiopia. The name of the city and airport may also be transliterated as Assosa.

Facilities 

Airlines and destinations

References

External links 
 

Airports in Ethiopia
Benishangul-Gumuz Region